Marian High School (also known as Mishawaka Marian) is a Roman Catholic secondary school in Mishawaka, Indiana, in the United States, operated by the Roman Catholic Diocese of Fort Wayne-South Bend. Marian was a top 50 school in 2005 noted on the Catholic High School Honor Roll. Marian High School holds a First Class commission from the Indiana State Department of Education and has been accredited by the North Central Association since early 1996. Marian received a letter grade of "A" for the 2013-2014 school year from the state. This is the third year that Marian has received this award

History
Marian High School was founded in 1964 by the Sisters of St. Francis. It was a co-educational school with separation of classes by gender (later changed).

Academics

AP and ACP Classes
Marian offers 18 AP (Advanced Placement) courses which are eligible for college credit. AP courses offered for the 2014-2015 school year include: AP English Language and Composition, AP English Literature and Composition, AP World History, AP U.S. Government and Politics, AP U.S. History, AP Micro Economics, AP Latin, AP Psychology, AP Calculus-AB, AP Calculus-BC, AP Statistics, AP Biology, AP Chemistry, AP Physics 1, AP Physics-C Mechanics, AP Physics-C Electricity and Magnetism, and AP Studio Art-2D. In addition, Marian offers ACP(Advanced College Project) classes through IUSB and non-AP dual credit courses through Ivy Tech Community College. These include Biology, Chemistry, Physics, U.S. History, Cadet Teaching, English, and Calculus.

Athletics
Marian is part of the Northern Indiana Conference.  Their teams are named the Knights and the school colors are royal blue and silver.  The following sports are offered at Marian:

Baseball (boys)
Basketball (boys & girls)
Cross country (boys & girls)
Football (boys)
State champion - 1973, 1975, 1976
Golf (boys & girls)
Boys state champion - 2001
Soccer (boys & girls)
Girls state champion - 2012
Boys state champion - 2015, 2016
Softball (girls)
Tennis (boys & girls)
Track (boys & girls)
Volleyball (girls)
State champion - 1973
Wrestling (boys)

Extracurricular activities

Band
Marian's band includes both pep and concert band, which compete annually in the ISSMA competitions. The band performs during athletic events, as well as holding both a Christmas and Spring concert annually. , the school does not have a marching band.

Mock Trial
Marian has participated in Indiana High School Mock Trial Association since the 1994 school year. The first year of the program, a Marian team won the state championship.

Notable people
Kyle Bornheimer (Class of 1994): Actor
Devin Cannady (Class of 2015): professional basketball player
D. J. Fitzpatrick: Former professional football player
Zander Horvath (Class of 2017): professional football player
Jaden Ivey: Didn't graduate, but attended for three years, professional basketball player
Demetrius Jackson (Class of 2013): professional basketball player
Bob Otolski: Former Marian High School Athletics Director and head football coach for the Illinois State Redbirds football team

See also
 List of high schools in Indiana

References

External links
 Marian High School website

Educational institutions established in 1964
Catholic secondary schools in Indiana
Private high schools in Indiana
Roman Catholic Diocese of Fort Wayne–South Bend
Schools in St. Joseph County, Indiana
Mishawaka, Indiana
1964 establishments in Indiana